Malvern Hills is a local government district in Worcestershire, England. Its council is based in the town of Malvern, and its area covers most of the western half of the county, including the outlying towns of Tenbury Wells and Upton-upon-Severn. It was originally formed in 1974 and was subject to a significant boundary reform in 1998. In the 2011 census the population of the Malvern Hills district was 74,631.

History

In 1974 the district of Malvern Hills was created from the former districts of Bromyard Rural District and Ledbury Rural District in Herefordshire, along with Malvern Urban District and Martley Rural District and Upton upon Severn Rural District in Worcestershire.

The current boundaries were formed on 1 April 1998 when the county of Hereford and Worcester (which had been created in 1974, following the Local Government Act 1972) reverted, with some border changes, to the two former counties of Worcestershire and Herefordshire. The new Malvern Hills district boundary was formed from parts of the existing districts of Malvern Hills and Leominster. The remainder of these districts became part of Herefordshire. The 1998 boundary changes added Tenbury Wells to the district, but Bromyard and Ledbury were transferred to the newly created Herefordshire Council.

Governance
Malvern Hills is a non-metropolitan district of the county of Worcestershire and comprises 68 civil parishes (list). The district is divided into 22 electoral wards. The local authority is Malvern Hills District Council, which meets and has its offices at Council House in Great Malvern, and which shares management and increasingly staff with neighbouring Wychavon District Council.

Boundary  changes
Following the 1998 boundary changes according to the split up of the county of Hereford and Worcester into the former traditional counties of Worcestershire and Herefordshire, the district acquired from the existing district of Leominster the parishes of Bayton, Bockleton, Eastham, Hanley, Knighton on Teme, Kyre, Lindridge, Mamble, Pensax, Rochford, Stanford with Orleton, Stockton-on-Teme, Stoke Bliss and Tenbury. From the pre-existing district of Malvern Hills, the parishes of Abberley, Alfrick, Astley and Dunley, Berrow, Birtsmorton, Bransford, Broadheath, Broadwas, Bushley, Castlemorton, Clifton upon Teme, Cotheridge, Croome D'Abitot, Doddenham, Earl's Croome, Eldersfield, Great Witley, Grimley, Guarlford, Hallow, Hanley Castle, Hill Croome, Hillhampton, Holdfast, Holt Fleet, Kempsey, Kenswick, Knightwick, Leigh, Little Malvern, Little Witley, Longdon, Lower Sapey, Lulsley, Madresfield, Malvern, Malvern Wells, Martley, Newland, Pendock, Powick, Queenhill, Ripple, Rushwick, Severn Stoke, Shelsley Beauchamp, Shelsley Kings, Shelsley Walsh, Shrawley, Suckley, Upton upon Severn, Welland, West Malvern and Wichenford.

Geography

The Malvern Hills themselves form the border between, and offer scenic views over, the counties of Herefordshire and Worcestershire. The district includes approximately half of the Malvern Hills Area of Outstanding Natural Beauty (prior to the 1998 alterations to its boundary, it covered most of the AONB). The district bounds onto the counties of Gloucestershire, Herefordshire and Shropshire, as well as the Worcestershire districts of Wychavon, Worcester and Wyre Forest.

The River Teme is famous for its fishing and runs across the northern half of the district, from Tenbury Wells, to its confluence with the River Severn near Worcester, close to the site of the Battle of Worcester. Historically, the Teme Valley was famous for its orchards and hop yards, though these declined during the second half of the 20th century, with some revival since circa 2000. The River Severn forms the eastern boundary of the district (with Wychavon) between Stourport and Worcester, whilst to the south of Worcester the district includes parishes to the east of the Severn; the river is also popular with anglers and has public navigation rights.

The area has a significant spa heritage and Malvern water is bottled and distributed commercially worldwide. The spa buildings (The Pump Rooms) survive at Tenbury Wells and many free spring water sources are available to the public in and around Malvern. In the east of the district is Croome Court, a significant National Trust property.

Energy policy
In May 2006, a report commissioned by British Gas  showed that housing in Malvern Hills produced the 6th highest average carbon emissions in the country at 7,329 kg of carbon dioxide per dwelling.

See also
Malvern Hills District Council elections
Malvern Hills Conservators

References

External links 
Malvern Hills District Council official web site

 
Malvern, Worcestershire
1998 establishments in England
Non-metropolitan districts of Worcestershire